Head On may refer to:

Film and television
 Head On (1980 film), a Canadian drama film
 Head On (1998 film), an Australian LGBT-related romantic drama film
 Head-On (film), a 2004 German-Turkish drama film
 Head On, a fictional film in the Entourage universe

Literature
 Head On (novel), a 2018 novel by John Scalzi
 Head On, a 2007 autobiography by Ian Botham
 Head-on, a 1994 autobiography by Julian Cope

Music
 Head On (Bachman–Turner Overdrive album), 1975
 Head On (Bobby Hutcherson album), 1971
 Head On (Samson album), 1980
 Head On (Super Collider album), 1999
 Head On (Toronto album) or the title song, 1981
 Head On!, an EP by Ausgang, 1984
 "Head On" (song), by the Jesus and Mary Chain, 1989; covered by the Pixies, 1991

Other uses
 Head On (video game), a 1979 arcade game by Sega
 Head On Photo Festival, an annual photography festival in Sydney, Australia
 Head-on collision, a type of vehicle collision
 HeadOn, a homeopathic product claimed to relieve headaches

See also
 Headon (surname)
 Headon, Nottinghamshire, UK